"The Incredible Lightness of Being a Baby" is the 18th episode of the thirty-first season of the American animated television series The Simpsons, and the 680th episode overall. It aired in the United States on Fox on April 19, 2020. The episode was written by Tom Gammill & Max Pross and was directed by Bob Anderson.

In this episode, Maggie reunites with her friend Hudson and they want to have a playdate, however, Marge disapproves of his mom Courtney and needs to swallow her pride in order for Maggie to be happy. Homer becomes friends with Cletus Spuckler, who realized he had a reserve of helium gas on his property, drawing the attention of Mr. Burns.

Plot
Marge takes Maggie on a stroll to the park where she meets her friend, a baby named Hudson, and Marge meets his mother, Courtney. Marge takes Maggie to Hudson's house for a play date, but Courtney's overprotective and judgemental behavior offend Marge. She later does not take Maggie to Hudson's birthday party, upsetting her daughter. In the end, Marge swallows her pride and allows the two babies to play together.

Meanwhile, in a subplot, Cletus has discovered a deposit of helium on his property, which he uses to operate a balloon stand. When Mr. Burns receives wind of this, he demands Homer swindle him out of the valuable gas, which can be used to cool the nuclear reactor. Homer befriends Cletus, and refuses to allow him to sign Burns's unfair contract. Burns tries to force him to sign, but the Spuckler family points their shotguns at him, forcing Burns to buy the helium at a fair price.

Production
This episode was originally going to air on April 7, 2019, but was put on hold after the show's producers decided to make a short film related to the episode involving Maggie and Hudson titled Playdate with Destiny. "I'm Just a Girl Who Can't Say D'oh" was broadcast in its place. The short film premiered on February 29, 2020, attached to advanced screenings of the Disney/Pixar release Onward with the episode serving as a sequel to it. "The Extremesons" couch gag was animated by Michał Socha and produced by Ron Diamond.

Reception
Dennis Perkins from The A.V. Club gave the episode a B− stating "There's nothing inherently wrong with anything in ‘The Unbearable Lightness Of Being A Baby,’ but there's nothing memorable about it, either. (The extreme sports couch gag notwithstanding. Letting different animators go to town on the mandatory episodic preamble has produced some truly memorable results in recent years, and, if this one isn't equal to the best, its stylized depictions of the family at extreme play is pretty bracing.) I have to confess that personal preference plays into my indifference for the episode, as neither Cletus nor Maggie hold much interest for me as central characters. That said, I'm always willing to have the show change my mind, but their depictions here succumb to the expected pitfalls."

Den of Geek gave this episode 3.5 out of 5 stars.

References

External links
 

The Simpsons (season 31) episodes
2020 American television episodes